Taste The Nation is a British daytime cookery show on the ITV Network. The judges are Henrietta Jane Green, William Sitwell and Richard Johnson. Nick Hancock is the host of the show, which airs weekdays at 5pm.

The Chefs

Series Guides
Series 1: 16 March – 24 April 2009

Round 1

Round 2

Quarter finals

Semi finals

Final

Chef Victories

See also
Britain's Best Dish

References

External links
 - Henrietta Green
 - William Sitwell

2009 British television series debuts
2009 British television series endings
ITV game shows
Television series by ITV Studios
English-language television shows